Wukongopterus is a genus of basal pterosaur, found in Liaoning, China, from the Daohugou Beds, of the Middle or Late Jurassic. It was unusual for having both an elongate neck and a long tail.
 
The genus was described and named in 2009 by Wang Xiaolin, Alexander Kellner, Jiang Shunxing and Meng Xi. The genus name is derived from Sun Wukong, the Monkey King, the main hero of the Chinese classic novel Journey to the West, and a Latinized Greek pteron, "wing". The specific name honours Li Yutong, senior preparator of the Institute of Vertebrate Paleontology and Paleoanthropology (IVPP).

The genus is based on holotype IVPP V15113, a nearly complete but compressed skeleton lacking the back and middle of the skull. The type individual appears to have broken its shin during life. Wukongopterus also may have had an uropatagium, a membrane between the hind legs.

Classification
Below is a cladogram following Wang et al. (2017)

See also
 Timeline of pterosaur research
 Darwinopterus
 List of pterosaur genera
 Daohugou Beds
 2009 in paleontology

References

Monofenestratans
Jurassic pterosaurs of Asia
Fossil taxa described in 2009
Taxa named by Alexander Kellner